Edward Andrews Downman or Edward Andrew Downman (died 24 October 1931) was an English Anglican clergyman and antiquary.

Educated at Southwark College, Downman was ordained in 1885 and curate of St Chad's, Everton from 1885 to 1887. Several archives contain his drawings of ancient earthworks.

Works
History of Bolsover, 1895
Ancient Church Bells in England, 1898
Plans of Ancient Earthworks, 1901–1915
English pottery and porcelain: A handbook for the collector, 1918
Blue Dash Chargers and other English Tin Enamel Circular Dishes, 1919

References

Year of birth missing
1931 deaths
19th-century English Anglican priests
English antiquarians